The 1995 Alamo Bowl was the third edition of the college football bowl game and matched the #14 Michigan Wolverines of the Big Ten Conference and the #19 Texas A&M Aggies of the Southwest Conference. Part of the 1995–96 bowl schedule, it was held on Thursday night, December 28, at the Alamodome in San Antonio, Texas.

Texas A&M scored first on a nine-yard run by running back Eric Bernard to take a 7–0 lead. Michigan answered with a 41-yard touchdown pass from quarterback Brian Griese to wide receiver Amani Toomer, tying the game. Texas A&M scored again following a 27-yard field goal by kicker Kyle Bryant, and Texas A&M reclaimed the lead at 10–7.

In the second quarter, Remy Hamilton kicked a 28-yard field goal for Michigan to tie the game at ten. Bryant kicked his second field goal of the game, a 49-yarder before half to give Texas A&M a 13–10 halftime lead. In he third quarter, Bryant added another 47-yard field goal to increase the lead to 16–10.

Michigan's 26-yard field goal from Hamilton closed the margin to three, but Bryant added field goals of 31 and 37 yards to put the game out of reach, giving Texas A&M a 22–13 lead with 22 seconds left in the game. Griese's 44-yard touchdown pass to Toomer pulled Michigan to within 22–20 with only five seconds left.

This was the final bowl win for the Southwest Conference, which disbanded the following spring. In the final AP poll, Texas A&M climbed to fifteenth and Michigan fell to seventeenth.

References

External links
 USA Today summary
 Summary at Bentley Historical Library, University of Michigan Athletics History

Alamo Bowl
Alamo Bowl
Michigan Wolverines football bowl games
Texas A&M Aggies football bowl games
Alamo Bowl